The University of Zululand or UniZulu is the only comprehensive tertiary educational institution north of the Tugela River in KwaZulu-Natal, South Africa. Its new status is in accordance with South Africa's National Plan for Higher Education aimed at eradicating inequity and costly duplication. As a result, UniZulu offers career-focused programs as well as a limited number of relevant university degree courses that have been structured with potential employees and employers in mind.

The university has extended its existing links with a wide array of tertiary educational institutions in the United States and in Europe by establishing partnerships with the University of Mississippi, Radford University, Florida Agricultural and Mechanical University and Chicago State University. UniZulu pursues an agenda for scholarly investigation in response to social problems, with community service being systematically integrated into the formal curriculum. The university strives to produce graduates with high-level knowledge and skills and who have been educated for citizenship and for active participation in society. To do so effectively, it seeks to cultivate relationships with funding agencies at home and abroad.
UniZulu was founded with the help of the Prince of Phindangene, Mangosuthu Buthelezi and he was chancellor of the institution when it was established.

History

The University of Zululand was first established in 1960 as the University College of Zululand with only 41 students, 75 per cent and 25 per cent female. As a constituent college affiliated with the University of South Africa (UNISA), it initially catered mainly for the Zulu- and Swazi-speaking groups.

In 1970, the college was granted University status. Since then the university has continued to expand and has experienced an increased intake of students from other parts of Africa, especially from Botswana, Cameroon, Eswatini, Ghana, Kenya, Lesotho, Namibia, Nigeria, Tanzania and Zimbabwe.

In 1982, the University of Zululand Foundation, administered by a board of Governors, was established to administer the university's fundraising and investment operations.

In 1984, the University Council was granted autonomy with regard to practically all matters relating to the disbursement of the annual subsidy, the provision of facilities and the employment of staff.

In 2002, this rural-based institution was declared a comprehensive institution offering both traditional degrees and career-focused programmes.  In 2005, the former six faculties (Arts, Education, Science and Agriculture, Law, Commerce and Administration) merged to become four faculties, namely Arts, Commerce, Administration and Law, Education, and Science and Agriculture.

In 2006, the existing Information Technology infrastructure was replaced by a R32,9 million system.

In 2008, the building of new student residences commenced.

In the 2021 academic year, under the deanship of Professor Kunene, and after the introduction of electrical and mechanical engineering qualifications, the faculty of Science and Agriculture was renamed the Faculty of Agriculture, Science & Engineering

In 2022 the Faculty of Arts, under the deanship of Professor A Masoga, was renamed to the faculty of Humanities and Social Sciences.

Campus
The main Campus is situated in Kwadlangezwa, 22 km south of Empangeni and about 142 km north of Durban off the N2 National Road on the KwaZulu-Natal North Coast. Empangeni (uMhlathuze Local Municipality) is the nearest town.

Satellite campuses
While in the past, the university has had satellite campuses throughout the KwaZulu-Natal Province and even further afield, it currently only has a satellite campus, offering mostly certificate and diploma programmes in Richards Bay. It also has a Science Centre, also in Richards Bay, which provides a hands-on science experience to school children from throughout the province.

Ranking

Students

Student enrollment
The University of Zululand is a contact-only university, with 8,751 students enrolled in 2007. This total included 8,738 full-time students and 13 part-time students. Of the total, 8,583 were South African citizens, while 75 were from other SADC countries and 93 students from non-SADC countries. Enrollment was 17,360 students for the academic year of 2018.

Campus media

Isigijimi was the official newsletter of the University of Zululand that published news for the university staff and management.
UZPress Online provided campus news to students as well as training opportunities for communications science students recruited through a portfolio of numerous articles. UZPress was established in August 2005 by Tendani Maemu, an IT student and web developer with the help of several other students under the Patronage of Thabo Leshoro, the Public Relations Officer of the university.
Campus Six has since been discontinued as a television broadcasting station, due to funding requirements.

Academic faculties
Programs are offered within four faculties:

Commerce, Administration and Law
The Faculty of Commerce, administration and law (Henceforth FCAL) is headed by the dean Professor Lorraine Greyling and comprises 5 academic departments, namely:

 Accounting & Auditing (including Information Systems) which headed by Professor M Livingstone CA (SA)
 Department of Business Management (incorporating Human Resources Management) which is headed by Dr N Vezi-Magigaba
 Department of Economics, headed by Professor I Kaseeram
 Department of Public Administration, headed by Dr NM Jili
 Department of law (Private law, Public law and Criminal & Procedural law) Which is headed by Dr K Naidoo

The Faculty participates avidly in community outreach and development programmes. The Faculty website : http://www.fcal.unizulu.ac.za/

Education
The faculty consists of six departments, namely, Comparative and Science of Education, Curriculum and Instruction Studies, Educational Planning and Administration, Educational Psychology and Foundations of Education.

Engineering, Science and Agriculture
The Faculty of Science and Agriculture offers various Science Programmes within the departments of Agriculture, Biochemistry and Microbiology, Botany, Chemistry, Computer Science, Consumer Science, Geography and Environmental Studies, Human Movement Sciences, Hydrology, Mathematical Science, Nursing, Physics and Engineering, Science Foundation and Zoology.

Humanities & Social Sciences

 The Faculty of Arts is the largest faculty within the institution and boasts 16 departments. The Faculty is headed up by the dean, Professor MA Masoga.
 Anthropology and development studies
 Communication science
 Creative Arts
 English
 General Linguistics and modern languages
 Geography and environmental studies
 History

Sports and recreation
Sports and Recreation is governed by the Student Services Department which carries out some of the co-curricular services that aim at contributing towards total personal student development and advancement. There are 23 sports codes classified as indoor and outdoor.

Indoor sports include aerobics, basketball, bodybuilding, boxing, chess, dance, judo, karate, pool, squash, and table tennis.

Outdoor sports include athletics, cricket, hiking, hockey, netball, rowing, rugby, soccer (men and women), softball, swimming, tennis, and volleyball.

Organisation
The University of Zululand's first convocation committee was appointed in 1984 with the late P.C. Luthuli as the first President.

Subsequent presidents were L.M. Magi, Sisho Maphisa, the late Jethro Ndlovu, Simo Lushaba, Mpho Makwana and Vusi Mahaye.

The current Convocation executive consists of: Bonginkosi Makhathini (President), Godfrey Ntombela (Deputy President), Nomalungelo Gina (Secretary), Gugu-Mapule Mashiteng (Treasurer), Petrus Ngomana (Additional member) and Mondli Ndlela (Additional member).

The first full-time Convocation Officer responsible for operations was appointed in 1998 and the incumbent, Thula Makhathini held the post until 2011. The current Convocation Officer is Sihle Mabaso.

Controversy
In 2007, the SRC led South African Students Congress introduced new lecture visual aids in lecture halls, however they destroyed some during protests regarding a backlog in student politics.

In 2009, a dispute over the SRC elections between the Inkatha Freedom Party-aligned South African Democratic Students Movement Sadesmo and the ANC-aligned South African Students Congress Sasco a lecture hall was burned down and several buildings were damaged.

Police officers investigating the 2018 murder of the Dean of the university's Faculty of Arts, Professor Gregory Kamwendo, stated that he was killed in an attempt to cover up a scheme issuing fraudulent PhD degrees from the university.

References

External links
 University of Zululand's official website

 
Public universities in South Africa
Educational institutions established in 1960
1960 establishments in South Africa